Brinnington and Central is an electoral ward in the Metropolitan Borough of Stockport. It elects three Councillors to Stockport Metropolitan Borough Council using the first past the post electoral method, electing one Councillor every year without election on the fourth.

Together with Davenport and Cale Green, Edgeley and Cheadle Heath, Heatons North, Heatons South and Manor, the ward lies in the Stockport Parliamentary Constituency. The ward had previously been in the Denton & Reddish constituency from 1983 to 1997, when boundary changes brought it back to Stockport. The ward contains Stockport town centre and major attractions including the Hatworks and Air Raid Shelters. Brinnington & Central is one of three Priority 1 centres for deprivation.

Councillors 
The ward is represented on Stockport Council by three councillors:

 Amanda Peers (Lab)
 Kerry Waters (Lab)
 Andy Sorton (Lab)

 indicates seat up for re-election.
 indicates seat won in by-election.
 indicates councillor suspended / defected.

Elections in 2010s

May 2019

May 2018

By-election 8 June 2017

May 2016

May 2015

May 2014

May 2012

May 2011

References

External links
Stockport Metropolitan Borough Council

Wards of the Metropolitan Borough of Stockport